Neocollyris glabrogibbosa is a species of ground beetle in the genus Neocollyris in the family Carabidae. It was described by Horn in 1929.

References

Glabrogibbosa, Neocollyris
Beetles described in 1929